Bloomingdale is an unincorporated community in Clay County, South Dakota, United States.

References

Unincorporated communities in Clay County, South Dakota
Unincorporated communities in South Dakota